Lubov Mikhaylovna Volosova (born August 16, 1982) is a female wrestler from Russia.

She won the bronze medal at the 2012 Summer Olympics in the women's 63 kg category.

External links
 bio on fila-wrestling.com

Living people
1982 births
Russian female sport wrestlers
Olympic bronze medalists for Russia
Olympic medalists in wrestling
Wrestlers at the 2012 Summer Olympics
Olympic wrestlers of Russia
Medalists at the 2012 Summer Olympics

World Wrestling Championships medalists
20th-century Russian women
21st-century Russian women